The 2018 German Football League season was the 40th edition of the top-level American football competition in Germany.

The regular season started on 21 April and finished on 9 September 2018, followed by the play-offs. The season culminated in the German Bowl XL, which was held on 13 October 2018 in Berlin.

Modus

During the regular season each club plays all other clubs in its division twice, home and away, resulting in each team playing 14 regular season games. There are no games between clubs from opposite divisions, interconference games having been abolished after the 2011 season.

The best four teams in each division qualify for the play-offs where, in the quarter finals, teams from opposite divisions play each other, whereby the better placed teams have home field advantage. The first placed team plays the fourth placed from the other division and the second placed the third placed team. From the semi-finals onwards teams from the same division can meet again.

The eighth placed team in each division enter a two-leg play-off with the winner of the respective division of the German Football League 2, the second tier of the league system in Germany. The winners of this contest qualify for the GFL for the following season.

League tables

GFL
The league tables of the two GFL divisions:

North
The defending division champion Braunschweig had a harder time walking away with first place this time than the previous year. While the Kiel Baltic Hurricanes who had proven fierce competitors in 2017 disappeared into obscurity (from which they wouldn't emerge for some years to come), the Dresden Monarchs finished with the same record as the Lions and the game between the two in Braunschweig was a 28–28 draw (The GFL does not have regular season overtime, thus making drawn games more likely) and ultimately the head-to-head was the deciding factor giving Braunschweig first place ahead of Dresden as Dresden had lost their home game against Braunschweig 24–44, which was the only home game that year that Dresden did not win. Just half a game behind the top duo were the Berlin Rebels, who were now the sole top-flight representative of the German capital in German Football after their crosstown rivals, the Berlin Adler, were relegated the previous year. Much behind the top trio was the final Northern play-off entrant, the Cologne Crocodiles who  had actually allowed more points scored by their opponents than they themselves had scored and finished barely above .500. The Hamburg Huskies were completely outmatched and lost every single game which continued into the relegation round ending their stint in the top flight that had begun in 2015.

South
In the South, Schwäbisch Hall continued its domination and added to the 17 wins of the previous season (14 regular season, 3 play-offs, including the German Bowl) another 14 on the way to a 50 game winning streak that wouldn't snap until German Bowl XLI. Frankfurt Universe were punished for some off-field financial improprieties by the league with having "four points" (equivalent to two victories) deducted from their total, but in the end it did not affect the standings as Frankfurt lost only to Schwäbisch Hall and won all its other games. In third place were the Allgäu Comets, the only other team with a winning record at 8–6. The tie-breaker for the fourth play-off spot in the South went to the Munich Cowboys as they had scored more points in their head-to-head games than the Marburg Mercenaries, both teams having won their home matches.

GFL2
The league tables of the two GFL2 divisions:

North

South

Relegation and Promotion round
Continuing their Yo-yo club tendencies, the Düsseldorf Panther returned to the top-flight after a two year absence. The following season would see them lose every single game, including both relegation matches against the Elmshorn Fighting Pirates sending them back to the second division GFL2 once more. In 2021 of course, they placed second there and are thus eligible to fill one of the two open spots for the 2022 German Football League in the North.

Play-offs
Frankfurt had surprising difficulty in the quarterfinals in overcoming the Berlin Rebels in a game where neither team scored a touchdown kicking the game winning field goal with 21 seconds remaining in the game after having given up a  Safety in the fourth quarter. Frankfurt had fewer first downs, fewer passing yards, fewer rushing yards and fewer third down conversions while also possessing the ball for a shorter amount of time than Berlin, but while the Rebels had only one Field Goal to show for four  Red Zone trips, Frankfurt scored a Field Goal during both their stints in the Red zone – enough to squeak by 6–5. The other quarterfinals saw the home teams win in more convincing fashion and there would thus be a repeat of the 2017 semifinal for Frankfurt while the Dresden Monarchs got another chance to snap their three game losing streak at Optima Sportpark, which had only been paused in 2017 because Dresden failed to make the semifinal altogether. Frankfurt managed to keep the game tied after four quarters and ultimately prevailed over Braunschweig in double overtime (both teams scored touchdowns with the point after Touchdown good in the first overtime period, but only Frankfurt scored in the second as Braunschweig were intercepted in their second possession) dealing the Lions their first post-season defeat since 2010. Dresden meanwhile failed to reverse their trend of semifinal defeats in Hall being shut out into the third quarter and having to give up a Safety in their 23–7 defeat to the defending champion. Thus German Bowl XL would see something not seen since 1981 – an all Southern final.

* indicates overtime win

Notes

References

External links
 Official GFL website 

German
Football League
German Football League seasons